Gerald Albert Schypinski (September 16, 1931 – March 25, 2019) was an American Major League Baseball shortstop.

Biography 
He collected 15 hits, including two doubles and batted .217.
Schypinski attended the University of Detroit Mercy. He signed with the Athletics while the team was still based in Philadelphia and he spent his entire four-season (1952–53; 1955–56) professional baseball career in the A's organization. He missed part of 1953 and all of 1954 while serving in the U.S. military during the Korean War.

Schypinski was errorless in the field as the A's shortstop. He died on March 25, 2019.

References

External links
Baseball Reference.com page

1931 births
2019 deaths
Baseball players from Detroit
Columbia Gems players
Columbus Jets players
Cordele A's players
Kansas City Athletics players
Lincoln A's players
Major League Baseball shortstops
Savannah A's players
Williamsport A's players